"Older" is a song by the Irish alternative rock sextet, Royseven, found on their debut album, The Art of Insincerity. The song was released as their debut Irish single in September 2006, entering the Irish Singles Chart on 14 September where it reached #6 for two weeks.

External links
 Official band website
 Royseven MySpace

2006 singles
Royseven songs
2006 songs
Universal Music Group singles